Åkre or Aakre may refer to:

People
Aakre, a list of people with the surname Aakre

Places
Åkre, Innlandet, a village in Rendalen municipality, Innlandet county, Norway
Åkre, Telemark, a village in Drangedal municipality, Vestfold og Telemark county, Norway

See also
Åker (disambiguation)
MV Sovetskaya Latviya, a ship that sailed under the name MS Aakre in the 1930s